is a 2011 Japanese drama film directed by Junji Sakamoto.

Cast
 Yoshio Harada as Yoshi Kazamatsuri
 Michiyo Okusu as Takako Kazamatsuri
 Ittoku Kishibe as Muchira No
 Kōichi Satō as Ippei Koshida
 Takako Matsu as Mie Oi
 Satoshi Tomiura as Daiji Raion
 Eita as Kanji Shibayama
 Renji Ishibashi as Kensan Shigetake

References

External links
 

2011 films
2011 drama films
Japanese drama films
2010s Japanese-language films
Films directed by Junji Sakamoto
Films with screenplays by Haruhiko Arai
2010s Japanese films